Pleasure Victim is the second studio album by American new wave band Berlin. It was originally recorded in 1982 and released in October of that year by M.A.O. Records and Enigma Records. After the second single, "Sex (I'm A...)", received considerable attention, the album was re-released on January 26, 1983, by Geffen Records in the United States and by Mercury Records internationally. The album marked the return of lead singer Terri Nunn to the group. To date, it is Berlin's best-selling album and was certified platinum by the Recording Industry Association of America (RIAA) on February 9, 1993, becoming the band's only album to be certified platinum.

"Sex (I'm A...)" peaked at number 62 on the Billboard Hot 100, while subsequent singles "The Metro" and "Masquerade" reached numbers 58 and 82, respectively. The album itself peaked at number 30 on the Billboard 200 in May 1983.

Release
Originally including seven tracks on both vinyl and cassette, Pleasure Victim is sometimes listed as being an EP album. Subsequent cassette and CD versions of Pleasure Victim include the extended version of "Sex (I'm A ...)" as a bonus track. According to John Crawford, the album's reissue on Geffen was identical to the original Enigma release aside from "a little remixing".

On August 31, 2020, a remastered version of Pleasure Victim was released on CD by Rubellan Remasters, expanded with single mixes and extended remixes from 1982 and 1983. Early versions of singles from 1981, when Berlin was with M.A.O. Records, were not available for licensing.

Reception

The album's original release on Enigma sold 25,000 copies, an exceptionally high amount for an independent release.

In a joint review of Pleasure Victims 1983 reissue and Soft Cell's The Art of Falling Apart, Michael Goldberg of Record panned the album, saying that Berlin's use of sex to sell their music (particularly noting the track "Sex (I'm A...)" and the inner sleeve photo of Terri Nunn wearing nothing but a mink stole) is unintentionally humorous, and that the instrumentation is riddled with synthpop cliches. He concluded, "Like bad pornography, comic books and a Top 40 hit like 'Rosanna', one can wallow in the sheer trashiness of Pleasure Victim, though you wouldn't really want to call this stuff 'music'".

Track listing

Personnel
Credits adapted from the liner notes of Pleasure Victim.

Berlin
 John Crawford – bass, synthesizer, vocals
 David Diamond – synthesizer, guitar, vocals
 Terri Nunn – vocals
 Daniel Van Patten – drums, electronic percussion
 Chris Ruiz-Velasco – guitar
 Ric Olsen – guitar
 Rod Learned – drums

Technical
 Daniel R. Van Patten – production ; engineering
 The Maomen – production ; remix 
 Charles Ramirez – engineering assistance
 Jon St. James – engineering assistance

Artwork
 PWR – still photography
 Mark Ulves – art direction, design
 Martin Mann – insert photographs

Charts

Weekly charts

Year-end charts

Certifications

References

1982 albums
Berlin (band) albums
Enigma Records albums
Geffen Records albums
Mercury Records albums